Woods Lake is a lake that is located east of Upper Benson, New York. Fish species present in the lake are pickerel, smallmouth bass, largemouth base yellow perch, pumpkinseed sunfish, and brown bullhead. There is access by trail from Benson Road on the west shore. No motors are allowed on this lake.

References

Lakes of New York (state)
Lakes of Hamilton County, New York